Malesherbia ardens, a member of Malesherbia (Passifloraceae), is a shrub with red flowers, native to the arid deserts of Southern Peru, though it can be found in the northern regions of the country. It is colloquially called Lampaya. The oldest known record of M. ardens dates 1927 in the 4th volume of the Field Columbian Museums' Botanical series. James Francis Macbride is accredited with its discovery.

M. ardens has a green woody stem and red tubular flowers. It is used traditionally to treat colds, coughs, bronchitis, and asthma. The dried plant is boiled with Contilo, Arabisca and Huamanripa and drank three times a day.

As of 2007, M. ardens is classified as endangered.

References 

ardens